Stephen F. Brown (April 4, 1841 – September 8, 1903) was a Union Army officer in the American Civil War, and became famous for taking part in the Battle of Gettysburg armed only with a camp hatchet.

Early life
Stephen Flavius Brown was born in Swanton, Vermont, on April 4, 1841.  He was educated in Swanton, became a teacher, and planned to begin studies at the University of Vermont in the fall of 1862.

Instead of beginning college, Brown enlisted for the Civil War as a Private in Company K, 13th Vermont Infantry Regiment.  He was soon elected the company's First Lieutenant.  The 13th Vermont was part of the 2nd Vermont Brigade, and carried out duties in Maryland and Virginia during 1862 and 1863.

Battle of Gettysburg
In July 1863, the 2nd Vermont Brigade marched from Maryland to Gettysburg, Pennsylvania, as part of the VI Corps.  While en route, Brown violated a "no straggling" order and disobeyed a security detail guarding a well to refill the canteens of several soldiers in his company who were succumbing to the effects of the summer heat.  Brown was placed under arrest and relieved of his sword and pistol, an officer's symbols of authority.  Given the circumstances unfolding at the Battle of Gettysburg, Brown was not detained and was allowed to keep marching with his men.

Once the 2nd Brigade arrived at Gettysburg, Brown determined to reclaim his honor by taking part in the fight.  Arming himself with a hand axe from a woodpile near his regiment's camp, Brown charged into battle to the cheers of his men.  During the hand-to-hand combat he compelled the surrender of a Confederate officer, whose sword and pistol Brown seized before making the Confederate a prisoner.

During the battle Brown suffered head trauma from the concussion of an artillery shell which exploded near him as he rendered aid to a member of the regiment who had lost a leg during the fighting.  Despite the hearing loss and other effects from the shell's concussion, Brown refused to leave the field, telling the regimental surgeon that he would continue to fight unless the entire regiment was ordered to retreat.

The 13th Vermont's role at Gettysburg included taking part in the counterattack on Pickett's Charge.  Units of the 2nd Vermont Brigade, commanded by George J. Stannard, marched out from the Union lines, executed a left flank maneuver, and fired directly into the flank of Pickett's men as they advanced.  Stannard's timely action effectively ended Pickett's Charge and the Battle of Gettysburg.

Brown continued to wear the captured sword and pistol until the end of his service.  The charges against him for violating the "no straggling" order were not pursued.

Later military service
After the 13th Vermont's term of service ended, Brown reenlisted, this time as a member of the 17th Vermont Infantry.  Promoted to Captain, he was assigned as commander of the regiment's Company A.

In May, 1864 Brown was wounded at the Battle of the Wilderness, when a bullet struck his left shoulder as he was giving orders to his company.  His left arm had to be amputated, and Brown was discharged in August, 1864.

Later life
After the war Brown enrolled at Albany Law School, from which he graduated in 1868.  He then relocated to Chicago, where he established a successful law practice and was also successful as a real estate investor.

During the Great Chicago Fire of 1871 he lost his law library, the building containing his law office and several other buildings he owned, but he was able to recover and continue his law practice and business activities.

In May, 1882 the U. S. Grant Grand Army of the Republic Post (Number 28) in Chicago held a testimonial dinner in Brown's honor, and presented him with a medal to commemorate his heroism at Gettysburg.

In 1891 Brown returned to Swanton so he could care for his aged parents, and he continued to reside there after their deaths.

Brown was elected President of the Reunion Society of Vermont Officers in 1901.  He was active in the Grand Army of the Republic (GAR) and the Military Order of the Loyal Legion of the United States (MOLLUS).

Death and burial
Brown died in Swanton on September 8, 1903.  He is buried at Church Street Cemetery in Swanton.

Family
Brown was the son of Samuel G. Brown (1816-1891) and Anne M. Crawford Brown (1817-1896).  Samuel G. Brown was a Civil War veteran, having served in Company A, 1st Vermont Infantry.

Stephen F. Brown's brother, Samuel G. Brown, Jr. (1842-1864), was a lieutenant in the 17th Vermont Infantry.  He died in Washington, D.C., as the result of contracting typhoid fever.

In 1896 Brown married Mary N. McDonough (1851-1925) in Swanton.

Legacy
 
The monument to the 13th Vermont on the Gettysburg battlefield is topped with a statue of Brown.  The War Department would not allow Brown to be depicted carrying his axe, regarding that as a tribute to disobedience of orders.  Instead, the statue depicts him with a sword at his side and an axe at his feet.

One panel on the base of the monument is dedicated to Brown.  It reads:

"The statue represents Stephen F. Brown, Co. K, who arrived on the field without a sword, but seized a camp hatchet, and carried it in the battle until he captured a sword from a Confederate officer.  Persevering and determining like him were all the men of this regiment of Green Mountain Boys."

Brown presented to the Vermont Historical Society the sword he seized at Gettysburg.

References

External links
 Stephen F. Brown at Vermont in the Civil War
 Ralph Orson Sturtevant, Pictorial History Thirteenth Regiment Vermont Volunteers (1910)

1841 births
1903 deaths
People from Swanton (town), Vermont
Military personnel from Chicago
Union Army officers
People of Vermont in the American Civil War
2nd Vermont Brigade
Albany Law School alumni
Illinois lawyers
Vermont lawyers
Burials in Vermont
American amputees